Snyderville Schoolhouse is a historic one-room school building located at Snyderville in Columbia County, New York.  It was built about 1860 and is a small rectangular one-story wood-frame building with clapboard siding and a gable roof.  Atop the roof is a small square bell tower.  It remained in use as a school until 1942.

It was added to the National Register of Historic Places in 2002.

References

School buildings on the National Register of Historic Places in New York (state)
One-room schoolhouses in New York (state)
Schoolhouses in the United States
School buildings completed in 1860
Buildings and structures in Columbia County, New York
National Register of Historic Places in Columbia County, New York